This is a list of parks in Daegu, South Korea.

See also
List of parks in Seoul
Geography of South Korea
List of rivers of Korea

References

External links
 http://tour.daegu.go.kr/best/history_list.php?menu_mst_cd=0004&menu_slv_cd=0001&menu=04
 https://archive.today/20071020021847/http://www.naukorea.com/n_pA/pA_02.asp?ocode=B000&code=B021

 
Daegu
Parks